Tralee was a constituency represented in the Irish House of Commons.

Borough
This constituency was the parliamentary borough of Tralee in County Kerry.

Following the Act of Union 1800 the borough retained one parliamentary seat in the United Kingdom House of Commons.

Members of Parliament
It returned two members to the Parliament of Ireland from 1613 to 1800.

1613–1615: Robert Blennerhassett and Humphrey Dethicke
1634–1635: Sir Beverley Newcomen and Sir George Radcliffe (sat for Armagh – replaced by Robert Blennerhassett)
1639–1649: Thomas Maul and Henry Osbourne (Osbourne resigned 1641) 
1661–1666: John Blennerhassett and Francis Lynn
1674: Cpt Robert Blennerhassett

1689–1801

Notes

Elections

See also
List of Irish constituencies

References

Historic constituencies in County Kerry
Constituencies of the Parliament of Ireland (pre-1801)
Tralee
1613 establishments in Ireland
1800 disestablishments in Ireland
Constituencies established in 1613
Constituencies disestablished in 1800